Pork and beans generally are a culinary dish.  The term may also refer to:

Pork and Beans (plant), the plant Sedum rubrotinctum
"Pork and Beans" (song), a song by Weezer
Liberty Square (Miami), a city neighborhood with public housing project locally referred to as Pork & Beans
Pork And Beans War (1838-1839), a confrontation between the United States and the United Kingdom